Daniel 'Dani' Ferreira Rodrigues (born 3 March 1980) is a Portuguese retired footballer who played as a winger.

Club career

Portugal
Born in São João da Madeira, Rodrigues started his career for C.D. Feirense, playing one full season in the Segunda Liga. In November 1998 he went on loan to AFC Bournemouth in England, being spotted by scouts from nearby Premier League club Southampton who recommended him to manager Glenn Hoddle.

England
In an act of "un-neighbourly piracy", Southampton nipped in and signed Rodrigues from Feirense for £200,000. He played two games as a substitute at the end of the 1999–2000 campaign, against Leicester City and Wimbledon.

Rodrigues showed promise and, when he went on loan to Bristol City at the end of 2000, he was an instant hit, but he broke an ankle in a match against Reading. He returned to the Saints and was fighting his way back to full fitness, when he broke the same ankle in training.

In an effort to rebuild his career, Rodrigues spent another spell on loan to Bristol City. Southampton released him from his contract in July 2002, and he was acquired by Walsall on a free transfer.

Greece / Return to England
Rodrigues was released by Walsall in January 2003, having made just one substitute appearance against Ipswich Town. He moved to Ionikos F.C. from Greece shortly after, scoring both of his Superleague goals for the side in the last round as they narrowly avoided top-flight relegation.

In March 2004, Rodrigues returned to England by joining Yeovil Town on a short-term contract, and netted four times in as many appearances, including a brace after coming off the bench on his debut against Bury. His exploits impressed Bournemouth boss Sean O'Driscoll, and he re-joined the latter for a second spell at the start of 2004–05.

In his second spell at Dean Court, with the club still competing in the Football League One, Rodrigues scored seven goals from 60 competitive matches.

New Zealand Knights
In August 2006, Rodrigues signed for New Zealand Knights FC (who however took part in the Australian A-League). He was seriously injured once again, this time with a rupture of the anterior cruciate ligament which kept him out of the game for the rest of the season.

Final spell in England
On 20 September 2007, Rodrigues joined Eastleigh. He was soon deemed surplus to requirements, after the arrival of new manager Ian Baird.

On 2 November of the same year, Rodrigues moved to the Conference South with Dorchester Town. He made his debut in a match at Newport County on the following day; on 29 December, the Magpies announced the player would not remain with the team.

Cyprus
For the 2008–09 campaign, Rodrigues signed for Onisilos Sotira in the Cypriot Second Division. He would remain in the country in the following years, representing several clubs.

References

External links
 

1980 births
Living people
People from São João da Madeira
Portuguese footballers
Association football wingers
Liga Portugal 2 players
C.D. Feirense players
Premier League players
English Football League players
National League (English football) players
AFC Bournemouth players
Southampton F.C. players
Bristol City F.C. players
Walsall F.C. players
Yeovil Town F.C. players
Eastleigh F.C. players
Dorchester Town F.C. players
Super League Greece players
Ionikos F.C. players
A-League Men players
New Zealand Knights FC players
Cypriot Second Division players
Digenis Akritas Morphou FC players
Onisilos Sotira players
ASIL Lysi players
Omonia Aradippou players
Doxa Katokopias FC players
Portugal youth international footballers
Portugal under-21 international footballers
Portuguese expatriate footballers
Expatriate footballers in England
Expatriate footballers in Greece
Expatriate association footballers in New Zealand
Expatriate footballers in Cyprus
Portuguese expatriate sportspeople in England
Portuguese expatriate sportspeople in Greece
Portuguese expatriate sportspeople in Cyprus
Sportspeople from Aveiro District